Chen Chi-chuan -- Frank C. Chen (June 6, 1898 – May 11, 1993), also known as Tan Khe-chhoan was a member of the "Chen family from Kaohsiung". He was a Taiwanese politician and businessman who served as the mayor of Kaohsiung between 1960 and 1968, and the co-founder and chair of Kaohsiung Medical College. Chen is a son of Chen Chung-he (陳中和), a sugar industrialist in the Japanese-ruled Taiwan.

Today, the Chen Chi Chuan (Frank C. Chen) Cultural Foundation https://www.frank-chen.org.tw/ promotes both the legacy of the former mayor and cultural events and resources for the citizens of Kaohsiung, a city that's been home to the Chen family for over 300 years. In 2021, the Frank C. Chen Foundation sponsored "Formosa Files," a podcast about the history of Taiwan hosted by longtime Taiwan residents John G. Ross and Eryk Michael Smith.

See also
Tu Tsung-ming

References

Mayors of Kaohsiung
Businesspeople from Kaohsiung
Taiwanese people of Hoklo descent
1898 births
1993 deaths
Kuomintang politicians in Taiwan
Academic staff of Kaohsiung Medical University
Keio University alumni
Chen family of Kaohsiung